The Adana Mersin Regional is an intercity rail service operated by the Turkish State Railways. It operates between two major cities of Turkey; Adana and Mersin. It also services Tarsus . The trains operate on the Adana-Mersin Main Line, the second busiest rail line in Turkey.

Stations

External links
TCDD

Turkish State Railways
Transport in Adana Province
Transport in Mersin Province